The 1979 Cardiff City Council election was held on Thursday 3 May 1979 to elect councillors to Cardiff District Council (later to become known as Cardiff City Council) in Cardiff, Wales. It took place on the same day as other council elections in the United Kingdom.

The previous Cardiff City Council elections took place in 1976 and the next full elections took place in 1983. 

The 1979 election saw the Conservative Party lose their majority to the Labour Party.

Background
199 Candidates from 5 parties ran. 1 Independent also ran in the Riverside ward was who was formerly of the Ratepayers Association. Despite being an incumbent Councillor he lost.

The Conservative Party ran a full slate of candidates. The Labour Party ran 69 candidates, Plaid Cymru ran 33 candidates and the Liberal Party ran 19 candidates.

Results
Contests took place in all except two of the wards at this election.

|}

Results by ward

Adamsdown

Canton

Cathays

Central

Ely

Gabalfa

Grangetown

Lisvane, Llanedeyrn and St Mellons

Llandaff

Llanishen

Penylan

Plasmawr

Plasnewydd

Radyr, St Fagans, Tongwynlais

Rhiwbina

Riverside

Roath

Rumney

South

Splott

Whitchurch

References

Cardiff
Council elections in Cardiff
Council elections in South Glamorgan
1970s in Cardiff